Pokhara International Airport  is an international airport in Pokhara, Gandaki Province, Nepal. The airport is Nepal's third international airport and officially began operations on 1 January 2023,  with STOL-operations to Jomsom still being operated from the old airport. The airport is expected to handle one million passengers per year.

History
The concept of constructing an international airport in Pokhara was first developed in 1971. In 1976, the Government of Nepal acquired land for that purpose. In 1989, the Japan International Cooperation Agency conducted a study regarding the construction of the airport. The project stalled, however, and was reinitiated in 2009, when a new agreement on air travel between India and Nepal was signed. In 2013, the Civil Aviation Authority of Nepal signed an agreement with China CAMC Engineering for the construction of the airport. The construction started in April 2016 and was expected to be completed after five years in 2021, with a cost of around US$305 million, out of which The Export-Import Bank of China provided around US$215 million preferential loan to Nepal and provided part of loan interest to lower the total loan interest. Further, the Asian Development Bank provided US$37 million in loans and grants and the OPEC Fund for International Development provided a US$11 million loan.

In April 2016, then Prime Minister KP Sharma Oli laid the foundation stone of the airport, with the aim of beginning operations at the airport on 10 July 2021. In 2020, it was proposed to open both new international airports of Nepal, Pokhara and Gautam Buddha Airport, on the same day. In 2020, it was revealed that the close-by Rithepani Hill to the eastern end of the runway would need to be flattened to ease aircraft approach to the airport. This decision was delayed due to severe protests by locals. The flattening did not start until late 2022.

Due to the COVID-19 pandemic in Nepal, in 2021, the construction deadline was extended until 2022. In October 2021, officials confirmed that the airport would open in two steps: domestic flights will begin in January 2022, while international flights will begin in April 2022.

In 2022, it was announced that calibration flights would begin in October 2022. They would later take place in late November 2022.

In mid-2022, the Civil Aviation Authority of Nepal pushed back the opening to December 2022 due to a lack of flight inspections. On 8 August 2022, the Civil Aviation Authority of Nepal set the official opening date for 1 January 2023.

The airport was inaugurated by Prime Minister Pushpa Kamal Dahal on 1 January 2023. To celebrate the occasion, the city of Pokhara declared the day a public holiday. The first flight to arrive at the airport was a Buddha Air flight carrying the Prime Minister and his delegation.

Development of the airport continued immediately after the opening with an initial lack of customs facilities and a fuel depot — initially, fuel was being carried from the old Pokhara Airport on trucks.

Facilities

The airport is built to the category 4D standard, set by the ICAO, IATA, and FAA.

Apron 
The apron of the airport can handle up to three narrowbody aircraft with two aerobridges, while the aprons at the domestic terminal are capable of accommodating up to four ATR-72 or Bombardier Q400 type and four Beechcraft 1900 or de Havilland Canada DHC-6 Twin Otter type small aircraft.

Runway 
It has an east-west orientation with a  runway strip. The airport has a concrete runway and has the markings of the centerline, edge, touchdown zone, and the threshold. The airside infrastructure works also includes two  exit taxiways, access roads, and  aerodrome pavement. The runway is capable of handling aircraft such as the Airbus A320 and the Boeing 737. All international landings and takeoffs will be done using the Eastern part of the runway. Domestic flights and landings will use both Eastern and Western sides.

Aids to navigation 
The airport features a  Air Traffic Control (ATC) tower, operations building and an air navigation unit. There are two non-precision approaches available at the Pokhara Airport; VHF omnidirectional range along a distance measuring equipment (VOR/DME) and Required Area Navigation (RNAV/RNP). The airport is also equipped with a CAT-I ILS system, which includes equipment such as the localizer and the glide path to help aircraft in navigation. The ATC tower also supports Wide area multilateration (WAM) based surveillance system, the first of its kind in Nepal.

High intensity  extended centerline lights are installed at the southern end of the airport to assist with the approach. It is equipped with advanced communication, navigation, and monitoring equipment and a high-end navigational lighting system. A QNH altimeter setting will be made available in approach and landing instructions.. However, QNH coding has generally fallen out of favor to modern telemetry.

ILS system is said to be operational only after 26 Feb 2023.

Terminals 
There are two public terminals at the airport, one for international traffic and one for domestic traffic. The new airport infrastructure includes a  international terminal building with a steel roof as well as a  customs and cargo building. The international terminal can handle up to 610 departing passengers per hour. Two terminals, one domestic and one international, will be able to handle one million passengers annually. The  domestic terminal is located to the western side of the airport.

Aircraft maintenance 
Buddha Air plans on constructing a hangar that can accommodate aircraft up to the size of an Airbus A319. The airport will also feature a  domestic and international hangar.

Air routes 
Nepal has asked India since 2014 (or earlier) for new air routes, but has not received them. Even though air routes are governed by the Freedoms of the air commercial aviation rights, India and Nepal are both signatories to it but one of India's reasons is that it involves India's security. Nepal has also proposed Himalaya 1, 2 and 3 air routes. These have not been implemented yet. 

In 2018, Buddha Air first announced that it was planning to operate its planned international fleet of Boeing or Airbus aircraft out of the airport. In mid-2021, Biman Bangladesh Airlines was the first international carrier to plan to serve the airport upon opening.  The first Nepali Airline, Buddha Air, revealed plans in late 2022 to make Varanasi the first destination from the airport. However, there are no scheduled international flights.

Airlines and destinations

The helicopter operators Air Dynasty, Prabhu Helicopter and Simrik Air offer helicopter operations out of their respective hubs at Pokhara International Airport.

Access
The airport is located linked by an access road with the Prithvi Highway. Buses also connect the airport to Pokhara's city centre.

Incidents and accidents
 On 15 January 2023, Yeti Airlines Flight 691 crashed on approach to Pokhara International Airport. The aircraft, an ATR 72-500, was carrying 72 people on board with 68 passengers when it crashed on the bank of the Seti Gandaki River. The airport was closed as authorities launched a rescue operation.

See also

List of airports in Nepal

References

External links

Airports in Nepal
National Pride Projects
Buildings and structures in Pokhara
2023 establishments in Nepal
Airports established in 2023
Transport in Pokhara